Kyungon is a village in Wuntho Township, Katha District, in the Sagaing Region of northern-central Burma (Myanmar).

Notes

External links
"Kyungon Map — Satellite Images of Kyungon" Maplandia World Gazetteer

Populated places in Katha District